Sir William Robert Mends,  (27 February 1812 – 26 June 1897), was a British admiral of the Royal Navy, eldest son of Admiral William Bowen Mends and nephew of Captain Robert Mends.

William Mends was born at Plymouth into a naval family. He married Melita, third daughter of Dr Joseph Stilon M.D. R.N. on 6 January 1839. The doctor was born Giueseppe Maria Joseph Stilon, a native of Calabria and a Royal Naval surgeon in Malta.

Naval career
He entered the Royal Naval College on 7 May 1825. On 11 August 1835 he became a lieutenant and from 30 December served on-board  in the Mediterranean (commanded by Edward Russell). From 13 January 1837 he served as lieutenant in  commanded by Hyde Parker, still in the Mediterranean.

From 3 November 1843 to 1846 he served as lieutenant in  commanded by Commodore Sir Henry Martin Blackwood stationed off Ireland and then the East Indies.

Mends was promoted to captain on 10 December 1852. From January 1854 he was captain of  serving in the Black Sea.
He spent May 1862 to February 1883 as Director of Transport at the Admiralty.

Mends retired at the rank of rear-admiral on 1 January 1869, was promoted to vice-admiral on 1 January 1874 and then a full admiral on 15 June 1879.

References 
Online biography

Further reading 
Laughton, J. K.. "Mends, Sir William Robert (1812–1897)". Oxford Dictionary of National Biography (2004 ed.). Oxford University Press. . Accessed 10 October 2010.
Mends, Bowen Stilon (1899). Life of Admiral Sir William Robert Mends G.C.B.. London: John Murray.

External links

1812 births
1897 deaths
Knights Grand Cross of the Order of the Bath
Military personnel from Plymouth, Devon
Royal Navy admirals
Royal Navy personnel of the Crimean War